This is a bibliography of ecology.

Introductory

Advanced

See also
Outline of ecology

Ecology